The 1964 Iowa State Senate elections took place as part of the biennial 1964 United States elections. Iowa voters elected state senators in 39 of the state senate's 59 districts. At that time, the Iowa Senate still had several multi-member districts. State senators serve four-year terms in the Iowa State Senate.

The Iowa Senate was expanded from 50 to 59 members and new district maps were drawn for the 1964 election. The Iowa General Assembly provides statewide maps of each district. To compare the effect of the 1964 redistricting process on the location of each district, contrast the previous map with the map used for 1964 elections.

The primary election on June 1, 1964 determined which candidates appeared on the November 3, 1964 general election ballot.

Following the previous election, Republicans had control of the Iowa state Senate with 38 seats to Democrats' 12 seats.

To claim control of the chamber from Republicans, the Democrats needed to net 18 Senate seats.

Democrats flipped control of the Iowa State Senate following the 1964 general election with the balance of power shifting to Democrats holding 34 seats and Republicans having 25 seats (a net gain of 22 seats for Democrats and net loss of 13 seats for Republicans).

Summary of Results
Note: The 20 holdover Senators not up for re-election are listed here with asterisks (*).

Source:

Detailed Results
39 of the 59 Iowa Senate seats were up for election in 1964.

Note: If a district does not list a primary, then that district did not have a competitive primary (i.e., there may have only been one candidate file for that district).

District 2

District 3

District 4

District 5

District 11

District 12

District 13

District 15

District 16

District 17
The 17th remained a 2-member district following the 1964 election. Subdistrict No. 1 held an election; however, Subdistrict No. 2 had a holdover Senator.

District 19

District 20
The 20th was a 2-member district following the 1964 election. Subdistrict No. 1 held an election for a four-year term; whereas, Subdistrict No. 2 held an election for a two-year term.

District 21

District 24

District 26

District 27
The 27th was a 3-member district following the 1964 election. Subdistrict No. 1 held an election for a four-year term. Subdistrict No. 2 had a holdover Senator . Subdistrict No. 3 held an election for a two-year term.

District 28

District 29

District 33

District 34
The 34th was a 2-member district following the 1964 election. Subdistrict No. 1 held an election for a four-year term; however, Subdistrict No. 2 held a special election due to the resignation of holdover Senator Robert D. Fulton who was elected lieutenant governor in 1964.

District 36

District 38

District 39
The 39th was a 2-member district following the 1964 election. Subdistrict No. 1 held an election for a four-year term; however, Subdistrict No. 2 held an election for a two-year term.

District 40

District 41

District 42

District 43
The 43rd held an election for a two-year term.

District 46

District 47

District 48

District 49

District 50

District 51

District 52
The 52nd held an election for a two-year term.

District 53

See also
 United States elections, 1964
 United States House of Representatives elections in Iowa, 1964
 Elections in Iowa

References

1964 Iowa elections
Iowa Senate
Iowa Senate elections